William Marcy Whidden (February 10, 1857 – July 27, 1929) was a founding member of Whidden & Lewis, a prominent architectural firm in Portland, Oregon, United States.

Early life
William Whidden was born on February 10, 1857, in Boston, Massachusetts. He was raised there and graduated from the Massachusetts Institute of Technology. He worked at the firm McKim, Mead and White from at least 1882 until 1888; projects included the Tacoma and Portland Hotels per wiki MM&W page 1–2011; then travelled to Portland, Oregon, in 1883 to work on the Portland Hotel. Whidden returned to Boston, but came back to Portland in 1887 to finish the hotel. He married Alice Wygant, great-granddaughter of John McLoughlin, in 1884 and had two sons.

Whidden & Lewis
In 1889, Ion Lewis and Whidden formed a professional architectural firm in Portland. Their residential buildings were mostly in the Colonial Revival style, while their commercial buildings were primarily in the twentieth-century classical style.  The commercial buildings often featured brick, along with terra cotta ornamentation. Many of their buildings are listed on the National Register of Historic Places (NRHP).

The Whidden–Kerr House and Garden, which was William Whidden's residence from 1901 until 1911, is also listed on the National Register.

Further reading
Marlitt, Richard. Matters of Proportion: The Portland Residential Architecture of Whidden & Lewis. Portland: Oregon Historical Society Press, 1989.

References

1857 births
1929 deaths
Massachusetts Institute of Technology alumni
Architects from Boston
Architects from Portland, Oregon